Plasmodium tumbayaensis is a parasite of the genus Plasmodium.

Like all Plasmodium species P. tumbayaensis has both vertebrate and insect hosts. The vertebrate hosts for this parasite are birds.

Description 

The parasite was first described by Mazza and Fiora in 1930.

Clinical features and host pathology 

The only known host of this species is the thrush Planethicus anthracinus.

References 

tumbayaensis